Currency of Man is the fourth studio album by American singer and songwriter Melody Gardot. It was released on June 1, 2015, by Decca Records and produced by Larry Klein. In 2016, the album was nominated for a Grammy Award for Best Engineered Album, Non-Classical.

Reception
At Metacritic, which assigns a normalized rating out of 100 to reviews from professional publications, the release received an average score of 78, based on six critical reviews, indicating "Generally favourable reviews". Aggregator AnyDecentMusic? gave the album a 7.1 out of 10, based on their assessment of the critical consensus.

Cristopher Loudon of JazzTimes stated, "...Gardot’s distinctively airy voice has undergone significant transformation, and is now muscular and freshly imbued with a deeply resonant soulfulness. Klein responds with meaty, potent arrangements-electrified, with plenty of horns and even a gospel choir-that both complement and elevate this new sound. And though Gardot has, since her late-aughts breakthrough, proven a formidable songwriter, Currency of Man‘s 10 compositions evince heightened power and authority, elevating her to the plateau of Leonard Cohen and Klein’s ex, Joni Mitchell, with shades of Marvin Gaye and Bob Dylan." David McGee of The Absolute Sound noted, "Currency of Man employs still more sound collages while deploying horns and strings in spare, small jazz combo atmospheres to frame Gardot’s seductive vocals that speak of societal ills in evocative, poetic terms." Thom Jurek of AllMusic stated, "Vocally, Gardot is stronger than ever here, her instrument is bigger and fuller yet it retains that spectral smokiness that is her trademark. Currency of Man is a further step away from the lithe, winsome pop-jazz that garnered her notice initially, and it's a welcome one."

Mattew Wright of The Arts Desk commented, "There’s something for everyone, at least. You could play the album at a family event and everyone would like at least one song. Gardot seems to have the voice to say something worthwhile, but in order to make it work, she needs to put away the toys and sing from the heart." The Guardian review by Kate Hutchinson added, "On her last album she explored world music; on Currency of Man, she’s gone "conscious". It’s not quite Erykah Badu, but when you’re a Grammy-winning easy-listening artist, it’s an admirable direction." Hal Horowitz of American Songwriter noted, "Don’t let the jazz reference deter you from this tour de force of original tunes, all penned by Gardot. It’s a perfect combination of restrained vocal phrasing with madly creative production and a certain candidate for one of the finest albums of the year."

Track listing

Personnel
 Melody Gardot – vocals
 The Waters Sisters – choir
 Vinnie Colaiuta – drums
 Dean Parks – guitar
 Larry Goldings – piano
 Maxime Le Guil – recording & mixing

Charts

Weekly charts

Year-end charts

References

External links

2015 albums
Decca Records albums
Melody Gardot albums
albums produced by Larry Klein